Nuno Gomes (born 1976) is a Portuguese former football striker.

It may also refer to:

Nuno Miguel Gomes (born 1978), Portuguese football defender
Nuno Miguel dos Santos Gomes (born 1979), Portuguese football defender
Nuno Manuel Soares Gomes (born 1980), Portuguese football forward
Nuno Gomes (diver), South African diver

See also
Nuño Gómez, Spanish municipality
Laura Nuño Gómez (born 1967), Spanish academic